Download (formerly Friday Night Download) is an Australian TV show hosted by Friday Night Games hosts Mike Goldman, Ryan Fitzgerald and Bree Amer. The show first aired on 26 October 2007. A second series began on 17 October 2008, but the show was pulled from schedules only two episodes into its run.

Overview 
Download showcased video clips collected from the Internet, such as those hosted on YouTube and Google Video. The show also prompted viewers to submit their own videos to the show.

Download also labels the hosts' top 5 favourite video downloads, each one shown just before a commercial break.

Reception 
The Sydney Morning Herald TV critic noted that the videos shown on the show could be viewed as easily on the internet without advertisement breaks, and as such claimed it should be "hosed off the pavement forthwith".

The show only averaged 748,000 viewers on its premiere night and was beaten by the Seven Network's Better Homes and Gardens. Although rating good enough for Ten to retain the show for their 2008 lineup, the show was axed when it slumped to 526,000 viewers in its last aired episode.

See also
 i-Caught

References

External links 
 Download TV Series

Australian comedy television series
2007 Australian television series debuts
2008 Australian television series endings
Network 10 original programming
Television series by Endemol Australia
Television series by Endemol
Television shows set in Brisbane